Lauricocha culture is a sequence of preceramic cultural periods in Peru's history, spanning about 5,000 years from c. 8000 to 2500 BC.

The total prehistoric sequence in Peru spans 15,000 years, starting at about 13,000 BC when the first gatherer-hunter societies left their traces in the Ayacucho and Ancash highlands. These were populations that were migrating from the North American continent through Central America and populated the Andes. Traces of these early groups have been found in rock caves of  Lauricocha, Pacaicasa and Guitarrero. 

The Lauricocha Cave at an altitude of over 4000 m was discovered in 1957 near Lauricocha Lake and the source of the Marañón River, one of the headwaters of the Amazon River. It contained human remains, the oldest found in Peru, which can be dated back to the last glacial period, c. 9,500 years ago.

The early Peruvian groups of gatherers and hunters traversed between the rugged highlands and the coastal areas, following the movement of the wild animal herds and the climatic change of the seasons. Lauricocha near Huánuco was one of the important mountain encampments.  The art of working stone to arrow points and fine blades was sophisticated, and the people made cave paintings of animals, hunting scenes and dances.

Lauricocha periods
 Lauricocha I: 8000 – 6000 BC (Andean preceramic III)
 Lauricocha II: 6000 – 4200 BC (Andean preceramic IV)
 Lauricocha III: 4200 – 2500 BC (Andean preceramic V)

See also 
 Amotape complex
 Paiján culture

External links 
 "The Original Peopling of Latin America", UNESCO

Prehistory of Peru
Pre-Columbian cultures
Indigenous peoples of the Andes
Andean preceramic
8th-millennium BC establishments
3rd-millennium BC disestablishments
1957 archaeological discoveries